The 21st BET Awards took place on June 27, 2021. The ceremony celebrated achievements in entertainment and honors music, sports, television, and movies. The ceremony's theme was "Year of the Black Woman" and was held in-person with a vaccinated audience following the previous year's virtual ceremony.

The nominees were announced on May 27, 2021. DaBaby and Megan Thee Stallion received the most nominations with 7 each, ahead of Cardi B and Drake, who tied with five nominations each.

On June 14, it was announced that actress Taraji P. Henson would host the ceremony for the first time, and that musician and actress Queen Latifah would be honored with the Lifetime Achievement Award.

Performers
The list of performers was announced on June 17, and was said to be the largest in the ceremony's history.

Winners and nominees

References

External links

BET Awards
2021 film awards
2021 awards
2021 awards in the United States
2021 in Los Angeles
2021 music awards
2021 sports awards
2021 television awards
June 2021 events in the United States